Hyderabad City Police FC, also known as City Afghans, were the most famous team in the Hyderabad Football Association. They were associated with the Hyderabad City Police during the reign of the Nizam of Hyderabad. The club was one of power houses of Indian football, praised for producing some of country's legendary players like Sayed Khwaja Aziz-ud-Din, Muhammad Noor, Syed Nayeemuddin, and Anthony Patrick, and Syed Shahid Hakim. In the 1950s, the club achieved success with their 2–3–5 formation.

History
Hyderabad City Police had enjoyed a series of endless achievements in the pre-Independence era, the first non-Kolkata club to do so. In 1941, the club reached final of prestigious Stafford Challenge Cup, but a defeat in hands of Bangalore Muslims Club let them finishing runner-up. The first major success came in 1943 when the team win Ashe Gold Cup final against Bangalore. The club established its legendary performance on national level when it won the prestigious Durand Cup against Mohun Bagan, the cup was held after a break of 8 years and first time after Indian Independence; it won total 4 Durand Cups, including one as Andhra Pradesh Police after 1959. The club won Rovers Cup consistently for five years from 1950 to 1954, and state league championships for 11 consecutive years.

It was N. A. Fruvall who shaped the club in his captainship early from 1940s, and by 1950 the team was transformed into the national champions. In 1951, Syed Abdul Rahim took over Hyderabad City Police club as a coach and served until his death in 1963.

The team underwent a change in name in the 1960s after the state of Andhra Pradesh was formed and Hyderabad became its capital, with the change in name of the police force to Andhra Pradesh Police. They continued to play as Andhra Pradesh Police Football Club and won tournaments like Rovers Cup in 1960 and DCM Trophy in 1965.

Honours
Durand Cup
Champions (4): 1950–51, 1954, 1957–58, 1961
Runners-up (3): 1952, 1956–57, 1963
Rovers Cup
Champions (9): 1950, 1951, 1952, 1953, 1954, 1957, 1960, 1962*, 1963–64
IFA Shield
Runners-up (2): 1954, 1962
DCM Trophy
Champions (2): 1959, 1965
Runners-up (2): 1964, 1970
Sait Nagjee Football Tournament
Champions (1): 1958, 1959
Stafford Challenge Cup
Runners-up (1): 1941
Madura Cup
Champions (1): 1947
(*) joint winners with East Bengal

See also
History of Indian football
List of football clubs in India

References

Further reading

Roselli, John. Self Image of Effeteness: Physical Education and Nationalism in Nineteenth Century Bengal. Past & Present (journal). 86 (February 1980). p. 121–48.
Sinha, Mrinalini. Colonial Masculinity, The Manly Englishman and the Effeminate Bengali in the Late Nineteenth Century (Manchester: Manchester University Press, 1995).
Chatterjee, Partha. The Nation and Its Fragments: Colonial and Post-colonial Histories (Calcutta: Oxford University Press, 1995).

External links
News archive at The Times of India

Association football clubs established in 1939
Association football clubs disestablished in 1963
Sport in Hyderabad, India
Football in Telangana
Police association football clubs in India